Julian the Hospitaller is a Roman Catholic saint, and the patron of the cities of Ghent and Macerata.

History
The earliest known reference to Julian dates to the late twelfth century.

There are three main theories of his origin:
 Born in Le Mans, France (possibly from confusion with Saint Julian of Le Mans)
 Born in Ath, Belgium, around 7 AD
 Born in Naples, Italy 

The location of the hospitals built by him is also debated between the banks of the River Gardon in Provence and an island near the River Potenza heading to Macerata.

The Paternoster (Our Father prayer) of Saint Julian can be found as early as 1353 in Boccaccio's Decameron, and is still passed on by word of mouth throughout some places in Italy. The account is included the 13th-century Legenda Aurea by the Genoan Jacobus de Voragine, a Dominican priest. Beautiful stained glass depicting Saint Julian by an unknown artist in Chartres Cathedral also dates back to the 13th century. Early fresco paintings of him are found in Trento Cathedral (14th century) and the Palazzo Comunale di Assisi.

Golden Legend

According to Jacobus de Voragine, on the night Julian was born, his father, a man of noble blood, saw pagan witches secretly lay a curse on the boy that would make him kill both his parents. His father wanted to get rid of the child, but his mother did not let him do so. As the boy grew into a handsome young man, his mother would often burst into tears because of the sin her son was destined to commit. When he finally found out the reason for her tears, he swore he "would never commit such a sin" and "with great belief in Christ went off full of courage" as far away from his parents as he could.

Some versions say that it was his mother who told him at the age of 10, while others say it was a stag he met in the forest while hunting (a situation used in artistic depictions of the saint). After fifty days of walking he finally reached Galicia, where he married a "good woman", said to be a wealthy widow.

Twenty years later, his parents decided to go look for their now thirty-year-old son. When they arrived, they visited the altar of Saint James. On leaving the church they met a woman sitting on a chair outside, whom they asked for shelter for the night as they were tired. She took them in and told them that her husband, Julian, was out hunting. (This is why he is also known as the patron of hunters.) Having found their son, the mother and father were overjoyed, as was Julian's wife. She treated them well and gave them her and Julian's bed. But the devil went off seeking Julian and told him that his wife was with another man.

Julian returned home and found two people asleep in his bed. Thinking that they were his wife and her lover, he killed them both. When he discovered his mistake, he vowed to spend the rest of his life doing charitable works. He and his wife made a pilgrimage to Rome. They continued their travels until they came to a river crossing. There they built a hospice to welcome weary and sick travelers, and Julian assisted people in crossing the river.  

Jacobus continues: "The enemy conspired again to ruin Julian—disguised as a weak pilgrim, he was let in by Julian with the others. At midnight he woke up and made a mess of the house." The following morning Julian saw the damage and swore never to let in anyone else in his home. He was so furious he had everyone leave. "And Jesus went to him, again as a pilgrim, seeking rest. He asked humbly, in the name of God, for shelter. But Julian answered with contempt: 'I shall not let you in. Go away, for the other night I had my home so vandalized that I shall never let you in.' And Christ told him 'Hold my walking-stick, please.' Julian, embarrassed, went to take the stick, and it stuck to his hands. And Julian recognized him at once and said 'He tricked me, the enemy who does not want me to be your faithful servant. He knelt and Jesus forgave him, and Julian asked, full of repentance, forgiveness for his wife and parents.

Veneration in Malta
Devotion to Saint Julian started in the Maltese Islands in the 15th century after the discovery of his relics in the city of Macerata. It was introduced by the noble family of De Astis, high-ranking in Malta at the time, who had strong connections with the Bishop of Macerata. Three churches were built in his honor before the arrival of the Knights: in Tabija, towards Mdina; in Luqa; and in Senglea (Isla). This last one had a storage room for hunters, and served to popularize this devotion through the sailors arriving at the Three Cities. In the 16th century there existed a hospital, Ospedale di San Giuliano, in the Citadel in Gozo, showing a wide devotion to the saint. Being an order of hospitaliers, the Knights of Saint John helped widen further this devotion. In 1539 they rebuilt the church in Senglea and in 1590 built another church in the parish of Birkirkara, a section that since then has been called St. Julian's. In 1891 the church was made a parish, the only one ever dedicated to the saint in Malta.

Patronage
Saint Julian was invoked as the patron of hospitality by travelers on a journey and far from home pray hoping to find safe lodging.

Julian the Hospitaller in literature and music
 Gustave Flaubert wrote a short story entitled "La légende de Saint-Julien l'Hospitalier", included in his Three Tales.
 Subject of an opera by Camille Erlanger, La légende de Saint-Julien l'Hospitalier (1888) based on the Flaubert story.
 Subject of an opera by Riccardo Zandonai, Giuliano (1928) with libretto by Arturo Rossato, based on stories by Jacobus de Voragine and Gustave Flaubert.
 Walter Wangerin, Jr. wrote a novel, classified as historical fiction, titled "Saint Julian".
 One of the tales in Giovanni Boccaccio's Decameron is named The miracle of Saint Julian, and is about a faithful devotee of Saint Julian whose faith is put to test during a travel.
 On "The Chronicles of Julian, the Hospitaller", a historical fiction set at the turn of the first millennium, Saint Julian meets the devil throughout his life, leading to an ultimate confrontation at construction site of the Bridge of Borgo a Mozzano, in Lucca, Tuscany. 

The Life of Saint Julian Hospitaller, (translated by Tony Devaney Morinelli). Earliest text: "La Vie de saint Julien"

Placenames
 St. Julian's – a town in Malta
 San Zulian – a church in Venice
 São Julião – other placenames in Portugal
 Saint-Julien-le-Pauvre – a 12th-century Gothic church in Paris
 San Julián
 St. Julian, an historic housing complex in Ashfield, NSW, Australia.

See also
 Saint Julian (other saints with the same name)
 :Category:Paintings of Julian the Hospitaller

References

Sources

SDCmuseum.org, St. Julian's. Translated from Maltese with permission.

External links
 , from Gesta Romanorum
 Julian the Hospitaller was mentioned in two important mediaeval scripts.Here are English translations for The Golden Legend (Volume III) and La Vie de saint Julien Translated by Tony Devaney Morinelli
 This patron saint of innkeepers was welcome at court
Julian the Hospitaller
The Life of St. Julian the Hospitaller
 Saint Julian the Hospitaller: The Iconography

Italian Roman Catholic saints
French Roman Catholic saints
Angelic visionaries